Evyatar Baruchyan (born 24 August 1989) is an Israeli footballer. His brother Aviram Baruchyan played for Beitar Nordia Jerusalem with him, and today Aviram plays for Hapoel Katamon.

References

External links
 

1989 births
Living people
Israeli Jews
Israeli footballers
Beitar Jerusalem F.C. players
Hapoel Katamon Jerusalem F.C. players
Nordia Jerusalem F.C. players
Israeli people of Kurdish-Jewish descent
Israeli Premier League players
Liga Leumit players
Footballers from Jerusalem
Association football midfielders